This page lists club winners of all men's association football honours run by the English national governing body The FA and its mostly self-governing subsidiary leagues the English Football League and Premier League.

England's first competition organized by a national body, the FA Cup, began in the 1871–72 season, making it the oldest football competition in the world. Arsenal hold the record number of wins, 14. League football began in the next decade with the founding of The Football League in 1888–89. The name First Division was adopted in 1892, when The Football League gained a second division. The First Division remained the highest division of the English football league system until 1992, when the Premier League was founded. Manchester United have won the most top division titles, with 20. The English equivalent of the super cup began in 1898 with the inauguration of the Sheriff of London Charity Shield, pitting the best professional and amateur sides of the year against each other. The trophy would develop into the FA Charity Shield in 1908, which was later renamed the FA Community Shield in 2002. The Football League created its own knockout competition in 1960, the League Cup. The Anglo-Italian League Cup was created in 1969 to match English cup winners against the winners of the Coppa Italia, and was permanently disbanded in 1976. In 1985, the Full Members Cup and Football League Super Cup were created as substitutes for UEFA competitions after UEFA responded to the Heysel Stadium disaster by banning English clubs. They finished in 1986 and 1992 respectively. The Football League Centenary Trophy marked The Football League's 100th birthday, in the 1988–89 season.

In the history of English football various subordinate competitions have also been organized, for those clubs ineligible for higher competitions. By 1893, professional teams had come to dominate the FA Cup, so The FA created the FA Amateur Cup for the 1893–94 season. This competition was discontinued in 1974, with the abolition of official amateur status and the creation of its partial successor the FA Vase. Sunday league football clubs play in the FA Sunday Cup, begun in 1964. The FA Trophy commenced in 1969 for those participants in Steps 1–4 of the National League System (tiers 5–8 of the overall English football league system). The Watney Cup, active from 1970 until 1973 was one of the first of these to have top division participants, though only for clubs that didn't qualify for UEFA competitions. The Anglo-Italian Cups, also begun in 1970, ran on and off in various formats until 1996. A third competition begun in 1970 was the Texaco Cup. It had entirely top division participants apart from the final season, and was one of the few competitions featuring clubs from different nations of the United Kingdom and Ireland, however, it only admitted clubs that didn't qualify for UEFA competitions. It shrunk in 1976 to become the Anglo-Scottish Cup, and shrunk again in 1981 to become the Football League Group Cup. In 1983, this was replaced by the Associate Members Cup, which featured clubs from League One, League Two. In 1992, when lower division clubs became full members of the Football League, the Associate Members Cup took the name Football League Trophy, before being renamed again in 2016 as the EFL Trophy. Since the 2016–17 season, sixteen Clubs with Category One academies from Championship and Premier League have taken part in the competition. The first clubs to receive an invitation will be the sixteen clubs that will be participating in the Premier League in the current season and which operate a Category One Academy and the order of priority will be based on first team finishing position in the immediately preceding season (across both the Premier League and Championship Division of the League).

Top-qualifying honours 
This section only lists competitions where there are no higher competitions clubs could participate in instead. See the next section for other competitions. See the final section for top-qualifying friendly competitions.

Winners of each competition are referenced above. Numbers in bold are record totals for that competition. Clubs in italics are Double winners: they have won two or more of the top division, the FA Cup, and the EFL Cup in the same season. Trophies that were shared between two clubs are counted as honours for both teams. Clubs tied in total honours are listed chronologically by most recent honour won.

Last updated on 26 February 2023.

Most recent (top-qualifying) 
See the first section for glossary of abbreviations. See the second section for clubs by wins in lower-qualifying competitions. Years in bold indicate the club that won the honour most recently.

Last updated on 26 February 2023.

Lower-qualifying honours 
This section only lists competitions where participating clubs could have qualified for a higher competition instead. See the previous section for other competitions.

Winners of each competition are referenced above. Numbers in bold are record totals for that competition. Trophies that were shared between two clubs are counted as honours for both teams.

Last updated 3 April 2022.

Friendly honours
This section only lists friendly competitions.

Winners of each competition are referenced above. Numbers in bold are record totals for that competition. Trophies that were shared between two clubs are counted as honours for both teams.

Last updated 20 July 2019.

Most recent
Years in bold indicate the club that won the honour most recently.

See also
List of English football champions
List of UEFA club competition winners
List of football clubs in England by competitive honours won

References

External links

Honours
Football clubs by honour